National Training Institute of Education, Science and Technology (NEST) is a training institute set up by the Korean Ministry of Education, Science and Technology (MEST). It is located in Bangbae 3-dong, Seocho-gu, Seoul, South Korea.

See also
 Education in South Korea

External links 
 교육과학기술연수원 (nest-was3)
 Ministry of Education, Science and Technology

Education in South Korea
Educational organizations based in South Korea
Research institutes in South Korea